German submarine U-977 was a World War II Type VIIC U-boat of Nazi Germany's Kriegsmarine which escaped to Argentina after Germany's surrender.  The submarine's voyage to Argentina led to legends, apocryphal stories and conspiracy theories that it and  had transported escaping Nazi leaders (such as Adolf Hitler) and/or Nazi gold to South America, that it had made a secret voyage to Antarctica, and even that it sank the Brazilian cruiser Bahia as the last act of the Battle of the Atlantic.

Design
German Type VIIC submarines were preceded by the shorter Type VIIB submarines.

U-977 was powered by two Germaniawerft F46 four-stroke, six-cylinder supercharged diesel engines while surfaced and two Brown, Boveri & Cie GG UB 720/8 double-acting electric motors while submerged. She had two shafts and two  propellers.

U-977 had a complement of between 44 and 60 men.

FLAK gun
U-977 mounted a single 3.7 cm Flakzwilling M42U gun on the rare LM 43U mount. The LM 43U mount was the final design of mount used on U-boats and is only known to be installed on (and ). 
The 3.7 cm Flak M42U was the marine version of the 3.7 cm Flak, used by the Kriegsmarine on Type VII and Type IX U-boats.

Service history

U-977 was launched on 31 March 1943. She was used in training and made no war patrols during her first two years of service. On 2 May 1945 she was sent on her first war patrol, sailing from Kristiansand, Norway, commanded by Oberleutnant zur See Heinz Schäffer (1921–1979). Schäffer's orders were to enter the British port of Southampton and sink any shipping there. This would have been a very dangerous assignment for a Type VII boat. When Admiral Dönitz ordered all attack submarines to stand down on 5 May 1945, U-977 was outbound north of Scotland.

Voyage to Argentina 
Oblt.z.S. Schäffer decided to sail to Argentina rather than surrender. During later interrogation, Schäffer said his main reason was a German propaganda broadcast by Goebbels, which claimed that the Allies' Morgenthau Plan would turn Germany into a "goat pasture" and that all German men would be "enslaved and sterilized". Other factors were remembrances of the poor conditions and long delays that German POWs suffered through, in being repatriated at the end of World War I (see Forced labor of Germans after World War II), and the hope of better living conditions in Argentina, which had a large German community.

Schäffer offered the married crewmen the option of going ashore in Europe.  Sixteen chose to do so and were landed from dinghies on Holsnøy island near Bergen on 10 May .

U-977 then sailed to Argentina. Schäffer's version of the voyage states that from 10 May to 14 July 1945 she made a continuous submerged Schnorchel passage, "at 66 days the second longest in the war [sic - Germany had surrendered] (after 's 68 days)".

The U.S. Navy (USN) interrogated the crew and issued a report on 19 September 1945. The report does not mention a 66-day submerged voyage, but states that U-977 "made for the Iceland Passage on course 300° [that is, northwest by west] diving once on sighting a plane and once on sighting a ship; she was also DF'd many times late in May". (This could also mean traveling at snorkel depth and then diving on contact; possible translation errors during interrogations.)

According to the Navy report, the submarine stopped in the Cape Verde Islands for a short break, then completed the trip traveling on the surface using one engine. Crossing the equator on 23 July, she arrived in Mar del Plata, Argentina on 17 August after 99 days at sea from Bergen and a voyage of 14,157 km (7,644 nmi, 8,797 mi). These points agree with Schäffer's report that he stopped at Cape Verde Islands for a short break and crossed the equator on 23 or 24 July 1945.

Schäffer said that, after the short Cape Verde break, they completed the rest of the trip to Mar del Plata alternately on the surface and submerged.

After surrendering to the Argentine authorities, as had happened to the crew of U-530, they were extradited to the US where they responded to the charge of having torpedoed the cruiser Bahia, and then to the UK, where they faced accusations that they had landed Nazi leaders in Argentina before surrendering. Schäffer was released in 1947. U-977 like U-530 was seized by the US Navy, and sunk during naval firing exercises, in its case in 1946, when it was used as a target.

In the arts
Schäffer later wrote a book: U-977 – 66 Tage unter Wasser ("U-977 – 66 Days Under Water"), the first postwar memoir by a former U-boat officer. It was published in 1952, and was translated into English under the title U-Boat 977.

A documentary film U-977 - 66 Days Under Water directed by Nadine Poulain, Schäffer's granddaughter, was in the final stages of production in 2014.

See also
 History of Mar del Plata
 Argentina during World War II

References

Bibliography

 Juan Salinas & Carlos De Nápoli (2002) Ultramar Sur: la última operación secreta del Tercer Reich ("South Overseas: the last secret operation of Third Reich")  Grupo Editorial Norma 
 Kittel & Graf (2015) The History of U-Boot Edizione R.E.I. 
 Paterson, Lawrence (2009) Black Flag: The Surrender of Germany's U-Boat Forces on Land and at Sea Seaforth Publishing 

 Schäffer, Heinz, Leonce Peillard Der U-Boot-Krieg 1999  (In German)
 Schäffer, Heinz, U-Boat 977: The U-Boat That Escaped to Argentina 2005  (First published in Germany in 1952 as U-977 – 66 Tage unter Wasser)

External links
 "Books: Go In & Sink". Time. 23 February 1953. Review of the book U-BOAT 977.

  (Mark Felton Productions)

Argentina in World War II
German Type VIIC submarines
U-boats commissioned in 1943
World War II submarines of Germany
1943 ships
Ships sunk as targets
Ships built in Hamburg
Captured U-boats
Maritime incidents in Argentina
U-boats sunk in 1946
Maritime incidents in 1946